is a Japanese manga series written and illustrated by Taichi Nagaoka. It has been serialized by Kadokawa Shoten on their Young Ace Up manga website since July 2019.

Premise
Kōta Ooyama is a high school student who lives alone. One day, Riko Akutsu, a delinquent classmate, suddenly arrives at his apartment complex and decides to use his room as her personal hangout. Despite wanting Akutsu to go home, Ooyama is conflicted about the situation.

Characters

Ooyama is a second-year high school student who lives alone, but has to deal with Akutsu since she is constantly hanging out in his room after school and sometimes even stays the night. While he does want Akutsu to go home, he becomes flustered when he is around her. He is also concerned that she might stay at some other guy's place if she leaves.

Akutsu is Ooyama's delinquent classmate who constantly hangs out in his room to read manga, play video games, and eat snacks. While she likes to tease Ooyama, she slowly develops romantic feelings towards him, especially after he makes statements like pleading her to stay and not wanting her to go off with any other guys.

Misaki is one of Akutsu's friends since middle school. Knowing that Akutsu has feelings for Ooyama, she likes to tease her about the situation. She is the shortest of the three girls and has short black hair with bunches.

Yōko is one of Akutsu's friends since middle school. Knowing that Akutsu has feelings for Ooyama, she likes to flirt with Ooyama in order to get a reaction out of Akutsu. She has short brown hair in a ponytail and a large chest.

Ōya is the landlady's 20-year-old daughter. As a fan of romantic comedy manga, she becomes very interested in Ooyama and Akutsu's relationship when she realizes Akutsu is secretly in love with Ooyama but shyly denies it.

 Ooyama's mother is a kind woman who shows up at her son's apartment. She was initially skeptical of Akutsu until she is convinced that Akutsu and her son are dating.

Hibiki is a year younger than Ooyama and Akutsu. She is a delinquent who initially tried to challenge Akutsu, but lost. Since then, she has looked up to Akutsu as a big sister and demands that Ooyama give Akutsu back to her. She and Akutsu used to hang out together in the same room.

Riko's mother shows up at Ooyama's apartment after she discovers her daughter's whereabouts. It is revealed she was a delinquent herself, as she also hung out often in her future husband's room, and she behaves very much like her daughter. The author intended to add more cute characters and ended up adding another Akutsu-san instead.

He shows up at Ooyama's apartment after Reiko has made a few visits. Like Ooyama, he had to deal with his future wife when she hung out in his room.

Publication
Written and illustrated by Taichi Nagaoka, Please Go Home, Miss Akutsu! began serialization on Kadokawa Shoten's Young Ace Up manga website on July 29, 2019. Kadokawa has collected its chapters into individual tankōbon volumes. The first volume was released on June 4, 2020. As of December 2, 2022, six volumes have been released.

On September 21, 2022, Seven Seas Entertainment announced they licensed the series. They will release the first volume under their Ghost Ship imprint in April 2023.

Volume list

Notes
 "Ch." is shortened form for chapter and refers to a chapter number of the manga.

References

External links
 

Japanese webcomics
Kadokawa Shoten manga
Romantic comedy anime and manga
School life in anime and manga
Seinen manga
Seven Seas Entertainment titles
Slice of life anime and manga
Webcomics in print